
AD 26 (XXVI) was a common year starting on Tuesday (link will display the full calendar) of the Julian calendar, the 26th Year of the Anno Domini (AD) designation, the 26th year of the 1st millennium, the 26th year of the 1st century, and the 6th year of the 3rd decade. At the time, it was known as the Year of the Consulship of Lentulus and Sabinus (or, less frequently, year 779 Ab urbe condita). The denomination AD 26 for this year has been used since the early medieval period, when the Anno Domini calendar era became the prevalent method in Europe for naming years.

Events

By place

Roman Empire 
 Pontius Pilate is appointed as prefect of Judea.
 Emperor Tiberius retires to Capri, leaving the Praetorian Guard under Lucius Aelius Sejanus in charge of the Roman Empire and the city of Rome.
 Romans crush an uprising of Thracian tribesmen.

Deaths 
 Claudia Pulchra, cousin and close friend to Agrippina the Elder (b. 14 BC)
 Marcus Asinius Agrippa, Roman consul
 Quintus Haterius, Roman politician
 Sun Deng, Chinese puppet emperor

References 

0026

als:20er#26